El cumple de la abuela is a 2015 Mexican romantic comedy film written and directed by Javier Colinas. The film stars Susana Alexander, Cesar Giraldo and Luis Arrieta in the lead roles.

The film premiered at the 2015 Chicago Latino Film Festival. The film was later released in Mexico on 1 January 2016 and received mixed reviews from critics. It was also streamed on Netflix on 20 December 2016 but was later removed by the platform in December 2017. Its sequel, Grandma's Wedding, was released in 2019 and opened to mixed reviews.

Synopsis 
A dysfunctional family travels all the way to Cuernavaca to celebrate Grandma Abuela's (Susana Alexander) birthday and all hello breaks loose when the father shows up with his new wife.

Cast 
 Susana Alexander as Abuela
 Cesar Giraldo as Julio
 Luis Arrieta as Daniel
 Luis Ernesto Franco as Sebastián
 Antonio Gaona as Juan Pablo
 Martha Claudia Moreno as Natalia
 Paola Núñez as Andrea
 Renata Notni as Julieta
 Marimar Vega as Ana
 Tiaré Scanda as Diana
 Macaria as Aurora
 Rodrigo Murray as Gerardo
 Elba Jimézez as Gema Rubí

References

External links 
 

2015 films
2010s Spanish-language films
Mexican romantic comedy films
Spanish-language Netflix original films
2015 romantic comedy films
Films shot in Mexico
2010s Mexican films